The area code 670 is the telephone area code in the North American Numbering Plan (NANP) for the U.S. Commonwealth of the Northern Mariana Islands (CNMI). It was created with the start of permissive dialing on July 1, 1997.  With the end of permissive dialing on July 1, 1998, it replaced the previous International Telecommunication Union country code +670, which is now used by East Timor.

History
Although the Northern Mariana Islands (NMI) became a commonwealth in 1978 and the United States assumed sovereignty in 1986, calling between the CNMI  and the rest of the United States remained an international call (011-670-xxx-xxxx). As international calling rates began to fall in the more competitive destination countries during the 1990s, it became a considerable financial burden for people calling between the U.S. Mainland and the CNMI.

After the CNMI was added to the North American Numbering Plan, the U.S. Federal Communications Commission (FCC) regulated calls to and from the CNMI as "domestic", hence dramatically lowering the cost of these telephone calls. This change also opened up national toll-free numbers to callers from the CNMI, which became very popular with the advent of pre-paid phone cards.

However, since no mobile telephone carriers in the U.S. are present in the CNMI market, cellular calls to the CNMI are not necessarily considered "domestic" or within the definition of "nationwide long distance".

Cost of international calls
FCC's regulation of the CNMI as "domestic" has no legal effect for telephone carriers outside the United States, for whom the CNMI is often not a competitive destination. Therefore, calls from other countries inbound to the CNMI can still be relatively expensive, especially compared to outbound calls from the CNMI since the CNMI has access to most U.S. toll-free numbers.

Dialing
Within the islands, only the seven-digit phone number is necessary. When a person in the islands calls anywhere in the United States or Canada, he or she simply dials 1 and then the area code and phone number. For callers in the U.S. or Canada calling to the islands, one first dials 1-670, followed by the seven-digit phone number.

See also
North American Numbering Plan

External links
 List of exchanges from AreaCodeDownload.com, 670 Area Code

670
Communications in the Northern Mariana Islands
Telecommunications-related introductions in 1997